Aithoor  is a village in the southern state of Karnataka, India. It is located in the Kadaba taluk of Dakshina Kannada district in Karnataka.

See also
 Dakshina Kannada
 Districts of Karnataka

References

External links
 http://Dakshina Kannada.nic.in/

Villages in Dakshina Kannada district